Vụ Bản is a town and the capital of the Lạc Sơn District of Hòa Bình Province, in the northwestern region of Vietnam.

References

Populated places in Hòa Bình province
District capitals in Vietnam
Townships in Vietnam